Wally Kelly (17 January 1914 – 6 January 1990) was  a former Australian rules footballer who played with Footscray in the Victorian Football League (VFL).

Notes

External links 
		

1914 births
1990 deaths
Australian rules footballers from Victoria (Australia)
Western Bulldogs players